is a train station on the  Osaka Metro Nagahori Tsurumi-ryokuchi Line in Yokozutsumi Gochome, Tsurumi-ku, Osaka, Japan.

Layout
The station has an island platform fenced with platform gates between 2 tracks underground. Ticket gates are located at only one place.

References 

Osaka Metro stations
Railway stations in Japan opened in 1990